

Final standings

ACC tournament 
See 2002 ACC men's basketball tournament

Postseason

NCAA tournament 

ACC Record: 10–3

1 Maryland (6–0) – National Champions
W 16 Siena 85–70
W 8 Wisconsin 87–57
W 4 Kentucky 78–68
W 2 Connecticut 90–82
W 1 Kansas 97–88
W 5 Indiana 64–52

1 Duke (2–1) – Sweet Sixteen
W 16 Winthrop 84–37
W 8 Notre Dame 84–77
L 5 Indiana 73–74

7 NC State (1–1)
W 10 Michigan State 69–58
L 2 Connecticut 74–77

7 Wake Forest (1–1)
W 10 Pepperdine 83–74
L 2 Oregon 87–92

NIT 

ACC Record: 0–1

Virginia (0–1)
L South Carolina 67–74

External links 
 https://web.archive.org/web/20080619014556/http://www.sportsstats.com/bball/standings/2002